Platz der Republik may refer to:

 Platz der Republik (Berlin)
 Platz der Republik (Hamburg)